The canton of Amboise is an administrative division of the Indre-et-Loire department, central France. Its borders were modified at the French canton reorganisation which came into effect in March 2015. Its seat is in Amboise.

It consists of the following communes:
 
Amboise
Cangey
Chargé
Limeray
Lussault-sur-Loire
Montreuil-en-Touraine
Mosnes
Nazelles-Négron
Neuillé-le-Lierre
Noizay
Pocé-sur-Cisse
Saint-Ouen-les-Vignes
Saint-Règle
Souvigny-de-Touraine

References

Cantons of Indre-et-Loire